So You Think You Can Dance, an American dance competition show, returned for its twelfth season, titled So You Think You Can Dance: Stage Vs. Street, on Monday, June 1, 2015. Seventeen episodes were broadcast on the Fox Network, including episode nine on Tuesday, July 21, 2015, which was a special celebrating the tenth anniversary of the show titled "A Decade of Dance Special Edition". The sixteen regular episodes aired each week on Mondays, rather than Wednesdays as it had been in recent previous seasons. On September 14, 2015, Gaby Diaz won the competition and made history by becoming the first tap dancer to win the title.

Auditions were held in Dallas TX, Detroit MI, Los Angeles CA, Memphis TN and New York NY.

Judges
Series creator and executive producer Nigel Lythgoe returned as a member of the permanent judging panel, along with new permanent members Paula Abdul and Jason Derulo.

The Team Captains, Travis Wall for Team Stage and tWitch for Team Street, were consulted on the selections for each team during the Vegas Call Backs.

Mary Murphy, who was a permanent judge in seasons 3 through 6 and seasons 8 through to 11, has not returned. Host Cat Deeley returns for her eleventh consecutive season.

Format
Season 12 featured a significant shift in format in that it was the first season where contestants were not selected based on their gender. Contestants were selected based on whether the competitor considered themselves a "Stage" dancer or a "Street" dancer. Stage styles included ballet, contemporary, jazz and tap, while the Street styles included freestyle, break dancing, hip-hop, and krump. Previously, the Dancers were selected across all genres and were divided by gender, with ten men and ten women being selected for the Top Twenty. This new format allowed the judges to respond to the strong number of female street dancers, and resulted in the Top Twenty, being eleven female and nine male dancers.

Once the "Top 20" were selected the public voted on their favourite dancers and the three stage and three street dancers with fewest votes were in danger of elimination. The mediums through which the public could vote continued from the previous season's methods of online through the So You Think You Can Dance website on fox.com, the Fox Now app, and SMS. Voting via telephone was once again not available.

The judges selected one stage and one street dancer from the remaining four dancers to be eliminated from the competition. When ten dancers were left in the competition, dancers were then eliminated purely on the votes from the public.

Season 12 saw the introduction of the ability for the audience to save one contestant from the stage and street teams from elimination, but only for the first four eliminations. When the Bottom 6 dancers were revealed during the live show, a five-minute period for Twitter voting was announced with one vote allowed for stage and for street per Twitter account. Once those contestants were saved, the judges were allowed to save one more dancer from each team for the first three eliminations; since the fourth was a double elimination, the Twitter vote was the only save; the judges had no say that week.

Once Top Ten were revealed, neither the audience nor judges were allowed to save any contestants.

Auditions
Open auditions for season 12 were held in five cities beginning on January 24, 2015. Lythgoe, Abdul and Derulo were the three judges for all the auditions.

In a change from previous years, the city auditions no longer had a "choreography round," where dancers whom the judges thought might not be able to handle someone else's choreography were taught a routine they then had to perform.

Callbacks
Callbacks were held in Las Vegas for season 12, a return to previous practice after season 11's were held in Los Angeles. A total of 219 dancers were given tickets at the five audition cities to the Las Vegas callbacks: 114 were selected for Team Stage, mentored by Travis Wall, and 105 were selected for Team Street, mentored by Stephen "tWitch" Boss. The first callback episode was scheduled for June 29, 2015, and the second callback episode, during which the Top 20 of 10 stage and 10 street dancers is revealed, aired on July 6, 2015.

Finals

Top 20 Contestants

Team Stage

Team Street

Note
 Alain "Hurrikane" Lauture had to leave the competition due to injury. Thus the judges brought back Asaf Goren who was number 11 in Team Street.

Elimination chart

Performances

Meet the Top 20 (July 13, 2015)
 Judges: Nigel Lythgoe, Paula Abdul, Jason Derulo
 Performances: Jason Derulo

Top 20 (July 20, 2015)
 Judges: Nigel Lythgoe, Paula Abdul, Jason Derulo

Top 18 (July 27, 2015)
 Judges: Nigel Lythgoe, Paula Abdul, Jason Derulo

Top 16 (August 3, 2015)
 Judges: Nigel Lythgoe, Paula Abdul, Jason Derulo

++JJ's partner Derek Piquette injured his back during rehearsals and was advised by doctors to rest for the week.  As a result, JJ performed with her choreographer Leonardo Barrionuevo and Derek Piquette is automatically in the Bottom 6 for next week.

Note: The "asterisk" symbol shows that the Dancer was saved by the live Twitter vote.

Top 14 (August 10, 2015)
 Judges: Nigel Lythgoe, Paula Abdul, Jason Derulo

Top 10 (August 17, 2015)
Group Dance: Music: "Earth Intruders"—Björk, Style: Jazz; Choreographer: Sonya Tayeh
Judges: Nigel Lythgoe, Paula Abdul, Jason Derulo

++JJ Rabone injured her ribs during rehearsals and was not medically cleared to perform either her solo or with an all-star partner. She would automatically have been in the Bottom 4 for the next week had she not been eliminated.

Solos:

Top 8 (August 24, 2015)
Group Dance: Music: "Lillies of the Valley"—Pina (soundtrack), Style: Broadway; Choreographer: Tyce Diorio
Judges: Nigel Lythgoe, Paula Abdul, Jason Derulo

Solos:

Top 6 (August 31, 2015)
Group Dance: Music: "Everybody Hurts"—Jasmine Thompson Style: Contemporary; Choreographer: Mandy Moore
Judges: Nigel Lythgoe, Paula Abdul, Jason Derulo

Solos:

Top 4 Performance Finale (September 7, 2015)
Judges: Nigel Lythgoe, Paula Abdul, Jason Derulo

Solos:

Season Finale (September 14, 2015): Judges & finalists' picks

All-Stars Dance Pool

 This dancer was eliminated this week.
 This dancer was in the bottom 4 this week.
 This dancer placed second in the competition.
 This dancer won the competition.

Ratings

U.S. Nielsen ratings

See also
 List of So You Think You Can Dance finalists

Notes

References

2015 American television seasons
Season 12